Pseudoips prasinana, the green silver-lines is a moth of the family Nolidae, common in wooded regions, and having a wingspan of 30–35 mm. It is found in the Palearctic realm (North and Central Europe, Russia, Siberia, Korea, Japan).

Technical description and variation

Forewing yellow green; costal edge pink, diffused towards apex; inner marginal area pink-suffused, except towards base; inner and outer lines oblique, darker green, conversely edged with white, the outer sometimes pink; subterminal line white, curved into apex: fringe pink with a white line at base; hindwing yellow; fringe pale pink, white at tips from apex to vein 2: abdomen white, dorsally suffused with yellow; in the female the abdomen is white, tinged with brown at base: forewing with costal edge white, and inner margin yellow; hindwing white. In the British form, subspecies P. p. britannica subsp. nov. (53 k), all the three lines are silvery white; the costal and inner margins in the male reddish only at apex and tornus respectively; in the ab. P. p. rufilinea ab. nov. (= ab. 2 Hmps.) (53 k) the outer line is marked with red. Larva apple green coarsely shagreened with yellow; the subdorsal line yellow; segment 2 red rimmed in front. The wingspan is 30–35 mm.

Biology
The moth flies from June to July depending on the location stridulating on the wing.
In August the larvae feed on oak, birch and several other deciduous trees.

References

Further reading
South R. (1907). The Moths of the British Isles, (First Series), Frederick Warne & Co. Ltd., London & NY.

External links
 Green silver-lines at UKmoths

Chloephorinae
Moths described in 1758
Moths of Asia
Moths of Europe
Taxa named by Carl Linnaeus